Richard N. Levy (1937–2019) was an American Reform rabbi. He was involved in the rabbis' protest during the St. Augustine movement for civil rights. Among other positions, he was the reformed rabbi at UCLA Hillel, he was the Director of the School of Rabbinic Studies at Hebrew Union College's Los Angeles campus and president of the Central Conference of American Rabbis.

References

1937 births
2019 deaths
American Reform rabbis
Hebrew Union College – Jewish Institute of Religion faculty
21st-century American Jews